Na Ghar Ke Na Ghaat Ke is a 2010 Hindi-language comedy film directed by and starring Rahul Aggarwal as a Uttar Pradesh migrant to Mumbai. The film was released on 12 March 2010.

Plot
Devki Nandan Tripathi (director Rahul Aggarwal) is a simple, rustic man who tries his luck in the city of dreams, Mumbai. He gets himself employed at the Mausam Vibhaag, his only means to a lucrative and thriving future. The plot thickens and so do Devki's circumstances, for he pursues something that he had never meant to. He finds himself doing everything except dedicating time to his vocation. He comes across an array of city people who often find his innocence amusing and comical, but Devki realises that they stick with him even in the thickest of bogs that his life hauls him in. From the village folk to the corrupt cop to the impish goon, Devki finds himself cared for and aided even while he feels entrenched in a Na Ghar Ke Na Ghaat Ke state of affairs. The film depicts the everyday struggle of common man in a ‘rural meets urban’ set-up.

Director Aggarwal plays the lead opposite Narayani Shastri, while one meets iconic characters played by Om Puri, Paresh Rawal, Ravi Kishan and Neena Gupta.

Cast
 Neena Gupta as Devkinandan's mother
 Ravi Kishan as Madan Khachak
 Anant Mahadevan as V. G. Chunawala
 Om Puri as Sankata Prasad Tripathi
 Paresh Rawal as Inspector Khote
 Ruma Sengupta as Devki's Dadi
 Narayani Shastri as Mithilesh
 Akshita Arora as Mithilesh ' mother 
 Rakesh Shrivastav as Devkinandan's father-in-law
 Neeraj Vora as Mr. R. K. Khanna
 Giaa Manek as Daughter of Sankata Prasad Tripathi
 Ehsan Khan	 ...	Special appearance
 Manmauji      	 ...	Special appearance
 Lalit Pandit   	 ...	Special appearance
 Shweta Salve	 ...	Special appearance
 Shriya Saran   as herself (Special appearance)

Soundtrack

Release 
The Times of India gave the film two out of five stars and wrote that "The intentions are noble. Debutant director, Rahul Aggarwal has a point to make".

References

External links
 

2010 films
2010s Hindi-language films
Indian comedy films